Daniel Ward (born 22 June 1993) is a Welsh professional footballer who plays as a goalkeeper for Premier League club Leicester City and the Wales national team.

Ward has previously played for Liverpool and Wrexham, as well as having loan spells at Tamworth, Morecambe, Aberdeen and Huddersfield Town. He was first called up to the Welsh national team in 2013 and made his debut in 2016. He was part of their squad that reached the semi-finals of UEFA Euro 2016, and the last 16 of Euro 2020.

Club career

Wrexham
Ward was born in Wrexham. He is a product of the Wrexham Academy, signing for them as a 14-year-old in 2007. In the 2010–11 season, Ward was briefly loaned out to fellow Conference Premier team Tamworth, making just one appearance in a league match on 12 March 2011 in a 3–2 loss against Hayes & Yeading United. He returned to Wrexham for the 2011–12 season and was promoted to the first team squad but only made it as far as the bench on a handful of occasions.

Liverpool
On 30 January 2012, it was announced that Liverpool had signed Ward for a fee of around £100,000. He was quickly promoted to the reserve team and featured in the 2011–12 NextGen Series where he played in the semi-finals.

Ward got his first call-up to the Liverpool senior squad in a League Cup game against Swansea City on 31 October 2012 as an unused substitute. His next senior call up wasn't until 12 January 2014 for a Premier League game against Stoke City where Ward was deputising for the injured Brad Jones.

In March 2015, he was loaned to League Two side, Morecambe for one month. On 21 March 2015, he made his Football League debut in an away game against Carlisle United.

By the end of the 2014–15 season, Ward had been Liverpool's substitute goalkeeper in 23 of the club's 58 games, taking his tally of squad call-ups to 25.

On 23 June 2015, Ward signed a new five-year contract at Liverpool, keeping him at the club until 2020. A few days later, he was loaned to Scottish Premiership club Aberdeen. He made his debut for Aberdeen on 2 July 2015, against FK Shkëndija in the first qualifying round of the UEFA Europa League. After the game, Aberdeen informed UEFA officials that Ward had been targeted by laser beams.

On 10 January 2016, Liverpool cut short Ward's loan at Aberdeen and he returned after impressing with 13 clean sheets in all competitions for the Dons, making him a firm fan favourite. On 17 April 2016, Ward made his debut for Liverpool against Bournemouth in place of Simon Mignolet, where Liverpool won 2–1. The Welshman was called into action on several occasions in the second half, denying King twice before making a great late save from Grabban's close-range header.

On 11 July 2016, he signed a season-long loan with Football League Championship side Huddersfield Town. He made his competitive debut for the Terriers in their 2–1 win over Brentford on 6 August 2016. Ward played in the play-offs for promotion, saving a total of three penalties, including the crucial fifth penalty in the final against Reading, to help Huddersfield to promotion to the Premier League.

Leicester City
On 20 July 2018, as the arrival of Alisson Becker relegated him to fourth choice at Liverpool, Ward completed a move to fellow Premier League side Leicester City for around £12.5 million on a four year contract. He made his debut on 28 August in the second round of the EFL Cup, keeping a clean sheet in a 4–0 win over Fleetwood Town. A month later in the next round, he saved three penalties in a shootout win at Wolverhampton Wanderers after keeping a clean sheet in a goalless draw, and was praised by teammate Marc Albrighton. Ward played only 14 times in his first three seasons at Leicester, and not at all in the league.

On 15 May 2022, Ward made his first Premier League appearance for Leicester—and his first overall since 2016—as the Foxes beat Watford 5–1 at Vicarage Road. Leicester manager Brendan Rodgers said that this was because he had chosen for Kasper Schmeichel to play three of the final five games in goal, and the other two for Ward.

Ward became Leicester's first-choice keeper for the 2022–23 season after Schmeichel's departure to Nice.

International career
Ward has represented Wales at under-17, under-19 and under-21 level. He was called up to the senior team for the first time for a friendly match against Finland,  and was an unused substitute in the 1–1 draw on 16 November 2013 at the Cardiff City Stadium.

He made his senior debut as a half-time substitute for Wayne Hennessey in an international friendly against Northern Ireland on 24 March 2016, conceding from Craig Cathcart in a 1–1 draw at the same ground. Ward was selected in Wales' 23-man squad for UEFA Euro 2016 and was handed his first start for his country in his third cap in their opening game of the tournament, a 2–1 victory over Slovakia, after Hennessey suffered a back spasm prior to the match.

Ward missed Wales' participation in the 2018 China Cup when his passport got lost in the post during his visa application, and Michael Crowe was called up in his place.

In May 2021 he was selected for the Wales squad for the delayed UEFA Euro 2020 tournament. Having held down the starting place since Hennessey's thigh strain in November 2020, Ward played all of Wales's matches at the tournament, being knocked out in the last 16 by his Leicester teammate Kasper Schmeichel's Denmark.

In November 2022 he was named in the Wales squad for the 2022 FIFA World Cup in Qatar. He made his World Cup debut on 25 November 2022 against Iran when Hennessey was sent off in the 86th minute, with the game finishing 2–0 to Iran due to two late goals in stoppage time.

Career statistics

Club

International

Honours
Liverpool
UEFA Europa League runner-up: 2015–16

Huddersfield Town
EFL Championship play-offs: 2017

Leicester City
FA Cup: 2020–21
FA Community Shield: 2021

References

External links

Profile at the Leicester City F.C. website

1993 births
Living people
Footballers from Wrexham
Welsh footballers
Association football goalkeepers
Wrexham A.F.C. players
Tamworth F.C. players
Liverpool F.C. players
Morecambe F.C. players
Aberdeen F.C. players
Huddersfield Town A.F.C. players
Leicester City F.C. players
National League (English football) players
English Football League players
Scottish Professional Football League players
Premier League players
Wales youth international footballers
Wales under-21 international footballers
Wales international footballers
UEFA Euro 2016 players
UEFA Euro 2020 players
2022 FIFA World Cup players